The canton of Saint-Ouen-l'Aumône is an administrative division of the Val-d'Oise department, Île-de-France region, northern France. Its borders were modified at the French canton reorganisation which came into effect in March 2015. Its seat is in Saint-Ouen-l'Aumône.

It consists of the following communes:

Auvers-sur-Oise
Butry-sur-Oise
Frépillon
Frouville
Hédouville
Hérouville-en-Vexin
Labbeville
Mériel
Méry-sur-Oise
Nesles-la-Vallée
Saint-Ouen-l'Aumône
Valmondois

References

Cantons of Val-d'Oise